Thulium(III) acetate is the acetate salt of thulium, with the chemical formula of Tm(CH3COO)3. It can exist in the tetrahydrate or the anhydrous form.

Properties
Thulium(III) acetate reacts with iron acetylacetonate at 300 °C, which can form the hexagonal crystal TmFeO3.

Reacting thulium(III) acetate with trifluoroacetic acid will produce thulium trifluoroacetate:
 Tm(CH3COO)3 + 3 CF3COOH → Tm(CF3COO)3 + 3 CH3COOH

References

External reading

 Mondry, A., & Bukietyńska, K. (2003). The power and limits of the Judd—Ofelt theory: a case of Pr3+ and Tm3+ acetates and dipicolinates. Molecular Physics, 101(7), 923-934.

Thulium compounds
Acetates